Down with Misery is a 1945 Italian comedy drama film directed by Gennaro Righelli and starring Anna Magnani, Nino Besozzi and Marisa Vernati. It was shot at the Farnesina Studios in Rome during the autumn of 1945. The film's sets were designed by the art director Gino Brosio. It was released in the wake Magnani's success in Roberto Rossellini's Rome, Open City. It makes reference to the thriving black market in postwar Italy and was followed by a loose sequel Peddlin' in Society (1946) which focused on a similar theme.

Synopsis
Nannina, a Roman housewife, is frustrated by her truck driver's husband Giovanni's refusal to take part in the black market and pressures him into take part in illegal actions with their more successful neighbour Gaetano. While he is in Naples, Giovanni rescues and adopts a boy he finds in the bombed-out southern city. His wife is furious and coldly rejects the boy at first, but gradually warms to him. Meanwhile, Giovanni becomes involved in fake currency smuggling, bringing the family increased prosperity, until he is caught and sent briefly to prison. The boy's father than turns up, he had gone missing rather than be killed in the bombing, and offers Giovanni an honest job.

Cast 
Anna Magnani as Nannina Straselli
Nino Besozzi as Giovanni Straselli 
Virgilio Riento as  Gaetano Schioppa
Marisa Vernati as Caterina Schioppa 
Vito Chiari as Nello Esposito 
Sandro Ruffini as  Porzio Ray
Lauro Gazzolo as Commendator Trombetti
Aldo Silvani as The cellmate
 Vittorio Mottini as The father of Nello
 Checco Durante as  The bellman of the radiogram
 Mario Castellani as  A police officer

References

Bibliography
 Burke, Frank. A Companion to Italian Cinema. John Wiley & Sons, 2017.
 Gundle, Stephen. Fame Amid the Ruins: Italian Film Stardom in the Age of Neorealism. Berghahn Books, 2019.
 Sorlin, Pierre. Italian National Cinema. Routledge, 2006.

External links

1945 films
1945 comedy-drama films
Italian comedy-drama films
Films directed by Gennaro Righelli
Italian black-and-white films
Lux Film films
Films set in Rome
Films set in Naples
1940s Italian films